The Compagnie des Cristalleries de Saint Louis is a corporation, founded in 1586 in Münzthal (Saint-Louis-lès-Bitche in French) in Lorraine. It is the oldest glass manufacturer in France with roots dating back to 1586 and the first crystal glass manufacturer in continental Europe (1781).

The Musée du cristal Saint-Louis exhibits 4 centuries of technical developments and artistic creations of the Saint-Louis factory. It is housed in one of the production halls of the factory, in Saint-Louis-lès-Bitche.

See also 
 Saint-Gobain

References

External links 
 

1767 establishments in France
Manufacturing companies established in 1767
Glassmaking companies of France
History of glass
Comité Colbert members
Museums in Moselle (department)
Companies based in Grand Est
French companies established in 1767